Night Club Scandal is a 1937 American thriller film directed by Ralph Murphy and written by Lillie Hayward. The film stars John Barrymore, Lynne Overman, Louise Campbell, Charles Bickford, Harvey Stephens, J. Carrol Naish and Evelyn Brent. The film was released on November 19, 1937, by Paramount Pictures. It was based on a play by Daniel Nathan Rubin.

Plot

After murdering his unfaithful wife in their apartment, Dr. Ernest Tindal leaves and her lover, Frank, discovers the body. Frank panics and flees, leaving his fingerprints. He is arrested, convicted and condemned to die.

A newspaper reporter, Kirk, and a police captain, McKinley, continue to investigate, particularly after Kirk becomes attracted to Vera, the suspect's sister. They successfully prove how Frank was falsely accused while Tindal conspires with gangsters Jack and Julia Reed, still hoping to get away with the crime. Tindal ends up shooting Jack but is taken into custody by McKinley.

Cast
John Barrymore as Dr. Ernest Tindal
Lynne Overman as Russell Kirk 
Louise Campbell as Vera Marlin
Charles Bickford as Det. Capt. McKinley
Harvey Stephens as Frank Marlin
J. Carrol Naish as Jack Reed
Evelyn Brent as Julia Reed
Elizabeth Patterson as Mrs. Elvira Ward
Cecil Cunningham as Mrs. Alvin
Barlowe Borland as Dr. Sully
John Sheehan as Duffy
George Guhl as Broun
Frank O'Connor as Alcott
Leonard Willey as Dr. Goodman
George Offerman Jr. as Messenger Boy
Virginia Vale as Marsh's Maid 
Robert Brister as District Attorney
Richard Cramer as Prison Guard 
John Hamilton as Governor

References

External links 
 

1937 films
American thriller films
1930s thriller films
Paramount Pictures films
Films directed by Ralph Murphy
American black-and-white films
1930s English-language films
1930s American films